Azzi Fudd (born November 11, 2002) is an American college basketball player for the UConn Huskies of the Big East Conference.

Fudd attended St. John's College High School in Washington, D.C. and became the first sophomore to win Gatorade Player of the Year. She was ranked the number one recruit in her class by ESPN.

High school career
In 2019, she was named the Gatorade National Girls Basketball Player of the Year after putting up averages of 26.3 points, 6.2 rebounds and 2.5 assists per game, becoming the first sophomore ever to win the award. She led her team to a 35–1 record and captured the District of Columbia State Athletic Association (DCSAA) tournament title.

Prior to her sophomore year, Fudd became one of the first girls ever to attend the SC30 Select Camp, an elite offseason training camp run by two-time NBA MVP Stephen Curry, and won the camp's three-point shooting competition. Shortly after that season, while playing in the final of the U.S. under-18 3x3 championships, held to determine the country's representatives to that year's FIBA U18 3x3 World Cup, she tore the ACL and MCL in her right knee. Because of the nature of her injury, her knee reconstruction required two separate surgeries—the first for the MCL, and the second several weeks later for the ACL. Both operations were performed by K. Donald Shelbourne, an Indianapolis orthopedic surgeon who had repaired her mother's torn ACL many years earlier.

While still undergoing rehabilitation, Fudd attended Curry's camp again. Shelbourne allowed her to compete in the camp's three-point contest again, but only if she could walk between the spots. Nonetheless, Fudd again won the contest.

Fudd returned to the St. John's team in January 2020, averaging 19.2 points, 3.5 rebounds and 2.0 assists for St. John's while still recovering from her injury before her season was prematurely halted by COVID-19. St. John's did not play an official schedule in 2020–21 for the same reason; the team played some unofficial exhibitions as the D.C. Cadets, with Fudd, who was the student body vice-president at the time, personally lobbying the school's principal for this arrangement.

Fudd averaged 25.2 points, 7.1 rebounds, 3.5 assists and 3.2 steals during an abbreviated senior season.

Recruiting

Fudd was a five-star recruit and was ranked number one in the class of 2021 by ESPN. She received her first scholarship offer in sixth grade from Maryland. On November 11, 2020, Fudd announced her commitment to UConn. She chose the Huskies over offers from Maryland, UCLA, Louisville, Oregon, Kentucky, Texas, and Notre Dame. She became the 12th number-one recruit to sign with UConn since 1998 and joined her best friend and former number-one recruit Paige Bueckers.

National team career
She has represented the United States internationally, winning gold medals at the 2017 FIBA Under-16 Women's Americas Championship in Argentina,  the 2018 FIBA Under-17 Women's Basketball World Cup in Belarus and 2021 FIBA Under-19 Women's Basketball World Cup in Hungary.

College career

Freshman Season

Fudd was selected Big East Preseason Freshman of the Year.

On November 21, 2021, Fudd made her collegiate debut for UConn, scoring seven points, and three rebounds in a 95–80 win over Arkansas. On February 6, 2022, in Fudd's first collegiate start against rival  Tennessee, she finished with a career high 25 points, along with four rebounds, and four assists. The following game, Fudd finished with a season high 29 points against Villanova in a 72–69 loss.

During the Elite Eight, Fudd helped UConn in a 91-87 double-overtime victory over NC  State scoring 19 points, five rebounds, and two assists, while playing a team high 49 minutes. She and Christyn Williams were named Bridgeport All-Region Team for their performances. She finished her freshmen year averaging 12.1 points, 2.7 rebounds, and 1.0 assists.

Sophomore Season
Fudd made her season debut on November 10, 2022, recording 26 points and 4 assists in a 98–39 win against Northeastern. On November 14, Fudd scored a career high 32 points and four assists in a 83–76 win against number three ranked Texas. The 56 points scored by Fudd set a record for the most points ever scored by a UConn player In the first two games of the season, beating the previous record held by Diana Taurasi. The 32 points scored against Texas tied a record held by Taurasi for the most points scored by a UConn player against a top-five opponent.  On December 4, against rival Norte Dame, Fudd suffered a right knee injury after a teammate fell on her knee. Fudd is expected to miss three to six weeks. On January 11, Fudd returned for the Huskies against St. John's after missing the previous eight games, she came off the bench and scored 15 points and only played 20 minutes due to minutes restrictions. Fudd will miss more time after reinjuring her right knee against Georgetown, one game after she had returned from a 5 week absence from the initial injury, the program announced. No timeline was released for Fudd's return.

Fudd made her return from a 22 game absence in the Huskies' 69-39 Big East tournament quarterfinal win over Georgetown Saturday, scoring 10 points in 17 minutes.

Career statistics

College

|-
| style="text-align:left;"| 2021–22
| style="text-align:left;"| UConn
| 25 || 17 || 27.9 || 45.7 || 43.0 || 91.2 || 2.7 || 1.0 || 1.0 || 0.7 || 1.0 || 12.1

|-
| style="text-align:left;"| 2022–23
| style="text-align:left;"| UConn 
| 7 || 7 || 31.3 || 53.3 || 42.6 || 92.3 || 1.4 || 2.7 || 1.4 || 0.3 || 1.7 || 20.6
|}

Personal life
Her mother, Katie, played at NC State and Georgetown before being drafted by the Sacramento Monarchs in the 2001 WNBA draft, while her father Tim played at American University. She was named after Jennifer Azzi, a player whom her mother admired. She has two younger brothers, Jon and Jose,  whom her parents adopted in 2011, and an older brother named Thomas.

Business interests

In September 2021, Fudd signed a Name, Image and Likeness (NIL) deal with Chipotle, as an ambassador for their "Real Food for Real Athletes" platform. In November 2021, she became an equity partner for sports drink BioSteel Sports Nutrition. In December 2021, Fudd signed with Golden State Warriors star Stephen Curry's SC30 Inc. brand for "multidimensional" partnership, which includes a sponsorship deal and personal mentoring from the four-time NBA champion.

References

External links
USA Basketball bio

Living people
2002 births
American women's basketball players
Basketball players from Virginia
McDonald's High School All-Americans
Sportspeople from Arlington County, Virginia
Sportspeople from Fairfax, Virginia
UConn Huskies women's basketball players